Keegan James Hartley (born 27 June 2004) is an English professional footballer who plays as a midfielder for  club Guiseley, on loan from  club Barnsley.

Career
Hartley joined the youth system at Barnsley in November 2015 and signed as a first-year scholar in July 2020. He made his first-team debut on 20 September 2022, coming on for Josh Martin as a 75th-minute substitute in a 2–0 win over Newcastle United U21 in an EFL Trophy group stage game at Oakwell. On 4 November 2022, he joined Northern Premier League Premier Division club Guiseley on a one-month loan.

Career statistics

References

2004 births
Living people
English footballers
Association football midfielders
English Football League players
Northern Premier League players
Barnsley F.C. players
Guiseley A.F.C. players